Jule Hake (born 24 September 1999) is a German canoeist. She competed in the women's K-1 500 metres and the K-4 500 metres  events at the 2020 Summer Olympics.

References

External links
 

1999 births
Living people
German female canoeists
Canoeists at the 2020 Summer Olympics
Olympic canoeists of Germany
20th-century German women
21st-century German women
ICF Canoe Sprint World Championships medalists in kayak